87th Street station is a station on the South Chicago Branch of the Metra Electric Line on the southeast side of Chicago, United States.

Though Metra gives the address for the station as being at 87th Street east of Commercial Avenue, it is actually closer to South Baltimore Avenue. The tracks run along the east side of a one-lane alley behind South Baltimore Avenue, which spans only from 86th Street to 87th Street.

West of this station is another Metra Electric station along 87th Street known as 87th Street (Woodruff) along the Main Branch. Parking is available at this station, but only street-side along 87th Street, on the south side between Houston and Burley Avenues, and on the north side between the tracks and Baltimore Avenue.

Bus connections
CTA
  87 87th

References

External links

87th Street entrance from Google Maps Street View

87th Street (Metra Electric)